Elin Lerum Boasson (born 28 May 1978) is a Norwegian environmentalist and was chairman of Natur og Ungdom in 2001 and 2002. She became active in the organisation in 1991, and joined the board in 1997 before she was elected deputy chairman in 1999. She has a Master of Political Science degree from the University of Oslo and has since 2005 worked at Nansen Institute as a researcher (as of 2009).

References

Norwegian environmentalists
Norwegian women environmentalists
1978 births
Living people
Nature and Youth activists
University of Oslo alumni